The Voice of the Listener & Viewer, originally just Voice of the Listener, is a British consumer group, championing public service broadcasting and speaking for listeners and viewers on the full range of broadcasting and media issues. It was founded in 1983 by Jocelyn Hay. In 2008, The Telegraph described Hay as "possibly the best lobbyist in the whole UK".

The BBC describe VLV as a "respected pressure group".

Campaigns in which the organisation has been involved include:
Challenged the Peacock Committee's proposals in 1986 to privatise Radio 1 and Radio 2
Opposing advertising on the BBC
Opposing the loss of the long wave frequency on BBC R4 in the 1990s.
Lobbying for the inclusion of a "public interest test", which must precede major media mergers (as part of the Public Voice coalition, which was formed in 2000 to influence the forthcoming Communications Act 2003) 
Opposing ITV's withdrawal from children's television production and its regional commitments after the Communications Act 2003.
Making a case that the costs for television licenses for the over-75s should be covered by the government and not by the BBC

Awards

The group also gives awards each year to radio persons and shows, voted for by members.

References

External links
Official website

1983 establishments in the United Kingdom
Political advocacy groups in the United Kingdom
Television organisations in the United Kingdom
Public broadcasting in the United Kingdom